Charles Richard Lau (April 12, 1933 – March 18, 1984) was an American professional baseball player and a highly influential hitting coach. During his playing career in Major League Baseball, Lau appeared in 527 games as a catcher and pinch hitter over all or portions of 11 seasons for four clubs. Then, beginning in 1969, he spent 15 years as a coach for five American League teams, most notably the Kansas City Royals. He was the incumbent hitting coach of the Chicago White Sox when he died, aged 50, from colorectal cancer in 1984.

As a player
Born in Metro Detroit, in Romulus, Michigan, he was signed by the nearby Tigers as an amateur free agent after graduating from high school. He began his playing career in the Tigers' farm system in 1952, missing 1953 and 1954 due to military service, and was called up for his first MLB audition in September 1956. However, Lau could not nail down a regular job with Detroit; he got into only 35 total games over parts of three seasons (–), and collected 13 total hits, batting .157.

In October 1959, former Tiger executive John McHale, now general manager of the Milwaukee Braves, acquired Lau and pitcher Don Lee from Detroit for infielder Casey Wise, pitcher Don Kaiser and catcher Mike Roarke. In , with Crandall sidelined by a sore shoulder, Lau appeared in 28 early-season games, 24 as starting catcher, into June. On April 28, he caught the second of Warren Spahn's two career no-hitters. But again he struggled offensively, batting .207, was sent to Triple-A Vancouver, then sold to the Baltimore Orioles on August 21. His offensive problems continued, though, with Lau batting only .170 in limited duty for Baltimore.

Lau had shown flashes of power in the Tigers' farm system, reaching double figures in home runs three times between 1955 and 1959. The result was a dramatic upturn in his major-league fortunes. He played in 81 games and posted a .294  batting average, with 58 hits, six home runs and 37 runs batted in. He hit .367 (11 for 30) in pinch-hitting roles. In , Lau started slowly, and after hitting .194 in 23 games, the Orioles sold his contract to the Kansas City Athletics on July 1. Given more playing time as a left-handed-hitting platoon catcher, starting 49 games over the 1963 season's final three months, he batted .294 in a Kansas City uniform. Splitting receiving duties with right-handed-hitting Dick Brown and John Orsino, Lau appeared in 62 games (starting 42) as Baltimore finished two games behind the New York Yankees in the American League race. He batted .259 as an Oriole, and .264 overall.

In , Lau began the transition to full-time pinch hitter, working in 35 games as a catcher, and collecting eight hits and seven bases on balls in 36 appearances as an emergency batsman; he batted a career-best .295. Appearing in only 18 games, all in the pinch, he collected six hits and four bases on balls as Baltimore won its first pennant and World Series championship. Lau did not play in the Fall Classic; the Orioles used no pinch hitters in their four-game sweep over the Los Angeles Dodgers. On November 27, 1967, the Braves released him, but appointed him manager of their Double-A Shreveport affiliate in the Texas League.

As a major leaguer, Lau batted .255 over the course of his career. His 298 career hits included 63 doubles, nine triples, 16 home runs and 140 runs batted in. He had 47 pinch hits.

As a hitting coach
Lau spent only the 1968 season as a minor-league skipper before returning to the majors as a coach. He began as bullpen coach on Earl Weaver's staff in Baltimore, then became the first-base coach of the  Oakland Athletics, gradually assuming the extra duties of hitting coach during his early coaching career.

In , Lau became the hitting coach (often doubling as first-base coach) for the Kansas City Royals. He held the post through , with the exception of the early part of the  season, when he was the team's roving minor-league hitting instructor after his temporary ouster from the Royals' staff by then-skipper Jack McKeon. He worked with Hal McRae, Amos Otis, Willie Wilson and George Brett. He is also credited for reviving Cookie Rojas' career. Lou Piniella, who played for the Royals from 1969 to 1973, called Lau "the greatest batting instructor of them all."

Contrary to popular belief, Lau did not emphasize releasing the top hand after making contact with the pitch and following through with only the lower hand on the bat.  He did, however, suggest this measure to hitters who—for whatever reason—could not fully extend their arms during their swings.

Lau developed a list of "Absolutes" about hitting, which included: 
 A balanced, workable stance
 Rhythm and movement in the stance (as opposed to standing still)
 A good weight shift from a firm rigid backside to a firm rigid frontside
 Striding with the front toe closed
 Having the bat in the launching position as soon as the front foot touches down
 Making the stride a positive, aggressive motion toward the pitcher
 A tension-free swing 
 Hitting through the ball
 Hitting the ball where it is pitched, rather than trying to direct it

While still serving as the White Sox' hitting coach, Lau died in 1984 in Key Colony Beach, Florida at the age of 50 after a year-long bout with cancer. Since his death, only one White Sox player or coach — Lau's friend and disciple Walt Hriniak, the Chisox' hitting coach from 1989 to 1995 — has worn his number 6 jersey, although it has not been officially retired. The baseball field at his alma mater, Romulus Senior High School, is named the Charley Lau Baseball Field.

Off the field
Lau also appeared in the film Max Dugan Returns as himself. The title character (played by Jason Robards) pays Lau to teach his grandson (Matthew Broderick's character) how to hit.

References

External links

Charley Lau's Quotes

1933 births
1984 deaths
American expatriate baseball players in Canada
American expatriate baseball players in Cuba
Atlanta Braves players
Baltimore Orioles coaches
Baltimore Orioles players
Baseball coaches from Michigan
Baseball players from Michigan
Charleston Senators players
Chicago White Sox coaches
Deaths from cancer in Florida
Deaths from colorectal cancer
Detroit Tigers players
Durham Bulls players
Jamestown Falcons players
Kansas City Athletics players
Kansas City Royals coaches
Louisville Colonels (minor league) players
Major League Baseball bullpen coaches
Major League Baseball catchers
Major League Baseball first base coaches
Major League Baseball hitting coaches
Marianao players
Milwaukee Braves players
Minor league baseball managers
New York Yankees coaches
Oakland Athletics coaches
People from Monroe County, Florida
People from Romulus, Michigan
Vancouver Mounties players
Romulus Senior High School alumni